Clarion is a city in and the county seat of Wright County, Iowa, United States. The population was 2,810 at the time of the 2020 census.

Clarion is the birthplace of the four-leaf clover emblem used by the 4-H Clubs of America, conceived of in 1907 by the local school superintendent, O.H. Benson.

Geography

Climate

According to the Köppen Climate Classification system, Clarion has a hot-summer humid continental climate, abbreviated "Dfa" on climate maps.

Housing

Clarion offers a wide array of housing. The city annexed  of land into the city limits to be used for housing development. Currently , lots are available as the first phase of the White Fox Landing Subdivision is under construction. The subdivision is located near the high school on the northeast side of town. There is also a Southpointe Housing Subdivision that has lots remaining for new housing in a newly developed area of Clarion.

Demographics

2010 census
As of the census of 2010, there were 2,850 people, 1,185 households, and 752 families residing in the city. The racial makeup of the city was 91.9% White, 0.5% African American, 0.3% Native American, 0.5% Asian, 0.1% Pacific Islander, 5.0% from other races, and 1.8% from two or more races. Hispanic or Latino of any race were 15.9% of the population.

There were 1,185 households, of which 30.5% had children under the age of 18 living with them, 49.9% were married couples living together, 9.3% had a female householder with no husband present, 4.3% had a male householder with no wife present, and 36.5% were non-families. 32.2% of all households were made up of individuals, and 18.2% had someone living alone who was 65 years of age or older. The average household size was 2.34 and the average family size was 2.94.

The median age in the city was 41.3 years. 24.8% of residents were under the age of 18; 7.1% were between the ages of 18 and 24; 22.5% were from 25 to 44; 24.9% were from 45 to 64; and 20.7% were 65 years of age or older. The gender makeup of the city was 48.8% male and 51.2% female.

2000 census
As of the census of 2000, there were 2,968 people, 1,255 households, and 786 families residing in the city. The racial makeup of the city was 93.67% White, 0.20% African American, 0.24% Native American, 0.13% Asian, 5.53% from other races, and 0.24% from two or more races. Hispanic or Latino of any race were 9.80% of the population.

There were 1,255 households, out of which 27.5% had children under the age of 18 living with them, 53.5% were married couples living together, 6.4% had a female householder with no husband present, and 37.3% were non-families. 33.1% of all households were made up of individuals, and 19.0% had someone living alone who was 65 years of age or older. The average household size was 2.29 and the average family size was 2.89.

Age spread: 23.6% under the age of 18, 7.2% from 18 to 24, 24.1% from 25 to 44, 21.7% from 45 to 64, and 23.5% who were 65 years of age or older. The median age was 42 years. For every 100 females, there were 90.1 males. For every 100 females age 18 and over, there were 86.7 males.

The median income for a household in the city was $37,026, and the median income for a family was $47,083. Males had a median income of $28,281 versus $23,077 for females. The per capita income for the city was $18,431. About 5.3% of families and 9.9% of the population were below the poverty line, including 12.4% of those under age 18 and 7.2% of those age 65 or over.

Religion
There are several churches in Clarion including First United Methodist Church, First Lutheran Church, St. John's Catholic Church, Clarion Church of Christ, United Presbyterian Church, United Church of Christ Congregational, The Dwelling Place, and the Lighthouse Church of the Nazarene. First Lutheran Church shares a pastor with the First Lutheran Church in Dows. St. John's Catholic Church is part of the Holy Family Cluster, which includes catholic churches in Clarion, Eagle Grove, and Belmond. Two churches are located in Holmes, an unincorporated community five miles west of Clarion, including Holmes Evangelical Lutheran Church and Holmes Baptist Church. Immanuel Lutheran Church (Lutheran Church–Missouri Synod) is located 6 miles east of Clarion. There are several faith based groups for people of all ages in Clarion as well, including CHICKS (Christ's Hands Influence Confidence, Kindness, and Self-Control) girls' non-denominational youth group, G3 (Glory Goes to God) that is a middle school boys' youth group, Iron Men ecumenical community men's study group, Marys and Marthas ecumenical women's service group, SHINE (girls 4th-5th grade group), Hiz Kidz (ecumenical after school program), among others.

Economy

Downtown

Clarion's downtown features several buildings built in the 19th century. The center of the business district is the Wright County Courthouse, listed on the National Register of Historic Places. Plans are currently underway to renovate the courtroom to both modernize the facility and restore some of the original architecture.

Industry
Clarion has seen industrial expansion creating additional jobs. The project added 120 new jobs to the community. The industrial park features a new paved access road, sewer and water on site, railroad on site, and is conveniently located just 2 blocks south of Highway 3.

Hagie Manufacturing is located on Central Avenue West. The company, incorporated by Ray Hagie, is responsible for designing and building the first high clearance sprayer. Today, the Clarion company boasts of manufacturing the fastest self-propelled sprayers in the world. Hagie has expanded significantly in the past three years, building a 75,000 square foot addition to their facility in 2008. They also acquired the former Meredith Corporation facilities which added an entirely new campus. Hagie is one of the leading employers in the Clarion area.

Some of the other industrial companies in Clarion include  Monsanto Company, Team Effort, SportsGraphics, Stronghold, Wright County Egg, Centrum Valley Farms, Ahrends Grips and North Central Cooperative. Wright County is the largest egg producing county in the nation.

Education
The community is within the Clarion–Goldfield–Dows Community School District. It was in the Clarion Community School District until July 1, 1993, when it merged into the Clarion–Goldfield Community School District. That in turn merged with the Dows Community School District on July 1, 2014.

Library

The Clarion Public Library was built in 1908. In 2009, an addition to the north side of the building was added. Also, a renovation project was finished that included doubling the square footage of the building. During the renovation, the original 1908 ceiling was revealed, along with a small attic that contained relics from the early 1900s.

Human resources

Public health
Iowa Specialty Hospital (formerly Wright Medical Center) is located in the city and was recently awarded such prestigious awards as the Firestarter Award by the Studer Group and the Summit Award by Press Ganey Associates. Wright Medical Center and Belmond Medical Center began a partnership, which eventually led to the two facilities being renamed Iowa Specialty Hospital.  In 2006 a major expansion and renovation project was completed making facilities state-of-the-art, including a new emergency room. The hospital enjoys patient satisfaction ratings of 99% and serves patients from a  radius of Clarion. Iowa Specialty Hospital employs about 450 people and has continued to experienced significant growth making it the 2nd largest "small hospital" in the state. A 2011 addition includes three new operating rooms, an out patient surgical clinic, specialty clinic, administrative offices, and a conference center on the lower level. The current maternity center will be renovated into additional labor and delivery rooms, the current specialty clinic will become expanded area for the family practice clinic. The project also included renovations to the radiology area of the facility. Iowa Special Hospital maintains state of the art campuses in Clarion and Belmond as well as outreach clinics in Clear Lake, Hampton, Webster City, Fort Dodge, and West Des Moines.  Wright County Public Health & Hospice is another healthcare provider in Clarion. There are two pharmacies, two dental clinics, two optometry clinics, two chiropractors, two medical supply stores, and a hearing aid center all located in Clarion.

Parks and recreation
In 2006 the new Clarion Aquatic Center was completed and opened in June. The aquatic center features two large slides, two deep-water drop-slides, a zero-depth beach-style entrance with play features, a six-lane lap swimming area, and two diving boards. Clarion has three city parks – the Aquatic Center Park (locally referred to as "Tornado Park"), which is located next to the Aquatic Center, Firemen's Park, and Gazebo Park. Lake Cornelia is located just north of town and features a natural glacier lake, large conservation park including modern camping sites, as well as a new walking/biking trail. Clarion also has a community-run digital movie theatre, renovated in 2012.

Culture and contemporary life

Tourism
Heartland Museum is located on the western edge of Clarion on Highway 3. Features include the large agriculture hall with much antique farm equipment, balcony level farm toy displays, and displays showing the history of agriculture. The museum is home to Alvina Sellers' Iowa Hat Lady collection of over 6,000 hats. Alvina was from Clarion and gave 5,636 programs including an appearance in the David Letterman Show. The Artist Teddy Bear Museum was completed in 2005 to accommodate the fourth Teddy Bear Reunion in the Heartland in Clarion. The celebration was held every five years since 1990–2010. Another feature of the museum is the period streetscapes that recreate businesses in Clarion from years gone by. The Wright County Historical Library in the museum is a history and research library of information all about Wright County located in the 1920s-1930s streetscape. The Heartland Museum also has a newly renovated and expanded community room available for rent and is home to the Clarion Historical Society and Clarion Arts Council. In 2013 another building was built to house more antique farm machinery.

The 4-H Schoolhouse Museum is another attraction that was added to the Heartland Museum complex in 2017. 

The restored Rock Island Depot is used as the office for the Clarion Chamber & Development.

Notable people
Lee Handley, professional baseball player
Roy E. Wilson, professional baseball player 
Glen Buxton, guitarist for Alice Cooper
Glen Brand, olympic gold medalist wrestler
Verlyn Klinkenborg, former writer of The Rural Life in the New York Times
Bernice Durand, physicist
Clifford Joy Rogers, politician

References

External links
 

 Clarion, Iowa

Cities in Iowa
Cities in Wright County, Iowa
County seats in Iowa